Turn Back Time – The High Street is a 2010 British reality documentary television series. The show started airing on BBC One on 2 November 2010 and ran for 6 episodes. The series is based and filmed in Shepton Mallet in Somerset, and sees four families experience life on the high street in various eras, namely the Victorian era, Edwardian era, 1930s, Second World War, 1960s and 1970s.

The series is narrated by Hugh Bonneville. Gregg Wallace, Juliet Gardiner and Tom Herbert are also involved in the series as the "Chamber of Commerce", keeping an eye on the activities of the families.

Episodes

The Shopkeepers
Grocers
Karl and Debbie Sergison own a delicatessen in real life.
They are joined by daughter Saffron (13) and Karl's son Harry (22)
Featured in all episodes.

Bakers
Caroline and Nigel Devlin are joined by their children Jack (15), Raiff (13), Saffron (12) and Chloe (9).
Featured in episodes 1–5.

Butchers
Andrew Sharp and his son Michael (14) are featured in episodes 1–5.

Ironmonger
Simon Grant-Jones is a professional blacksmith and is featured in episodes 1–4.

Dressmaker
Gillian “Gill” Cockwell is featured in episodes 2–6.

Record Shop
David Lashmar is featured in episode 6.

Convenience Store
Sunder and Pam Sandher are joined by children Karina (16) and Josh (12).
They are featured in episode 6.

DVD
Turn Back Time: The High Street was released on 6 June 2012 by Acorn Media UK.

External links
 
 

2010 British television series debuts
2010 British television series endings
BBC high definition shows
BBC Television shows
Historical reality television series
Shepton Mallet
English-language television shows
Television series by Warner Bros. Television Studios